The 1970–71 Memphis Pros season was the 1st season of the Pros in the American Basketball Association after three seasons in New Orleans as the Buccaneers, with P.W. Blake of Mississippi buying the team on August 21, 1970 and moving the team 10 days later to Memphis. Due to having to reuse the Bucs' jerseys with a name that would fit the four letters they had put on the home and road jerseys, the team was named "Pros". However the Pros had to deal with limited dates to book for games at the Mid-South Coliseum, with some of the games being played in Jackson, Mississippi. On October 20, 1970, the Pros played their first ever game, playing the New York Nets in Memphis, losing 108–103. The biggest losing streak was 8, coming near the end of the season, with them losing 20 out of their last 30 games. However, they sneaked into the playoffs, finishing 3rd over the Texas Chaparrals and Denver Rockets by 11 games. The Pros finished dead last in points scored per game with 109.2, but finished first in points allowed at 109.9 per game. In the playoffs, they were swept by the Indiana Pacers. 

Meanwhile, Blake had decided to let the league take over operations of the team less than midway through the season, claiming losses of $200,000. With the threat of the team being bought and relocated somewhere else, the city of Memphis attempted to save the team with a public offering named "Save the Pros" on February 12, 1971, in which people could buy stock certificates of either $5, $10, or $50. In total, over 4,000 people bought stock in the team. The plan worked, and subsequently the Pros would now be owned by Memphis Area Sports Inc., with a 24-member board of directors.

Roster     
 22 Al Cueto - Center
 34 Lee Davis - Power forward
 12 Coby Dietrick - Center
 25 Gerald Govan - Center
 15 Jimmy Jones  - Point guard
 23 Steve Jones - Shooting guard
 11 Wil Jones - Power forward
 33 Wendell Ladner - Small forward
 32 Craig Raymond - Center
 24 Skeeter Swift - Shooting guard
 21 Bob Warren - Shooting guard
 10 Charlie Williams - Shooting guard

Final standings

Western Division

Playoffs
Western Division Semifinals vs Indiana Pacers

Pros lose series, 4–0

Awards and honors
1971 ABA All-Star Game selection (game played on January 23, 1971) 
 Jimmy Jones 
 Steve Jones
 Wendell Ladner

References

External links
 RememberTheABA.com 1970–71 regular season and playoff results
 Memphis Pros page

Memphis Pros
Memphis Pros, 1970-71
Memphis Pros, 1970-71
Basketball in Tennessee